The Charles H. Morrill Homestead is a historic house in Stromsburg, Nebraska. It was built in 1872 by Ludwig Rudeen, a Swedish immigrant, for Charles Henry Morrill, a homesteader. Morrill was also the founder of the Stromsburg Bank, and a member of the Republican National Committee. The house was designed in the Swiss chalet style. It has been listed on the National Register of Historic Places since June 4, 1973.

References

National Register of Historic Places in Polk County, Nebraska
Houses completed in 1872
Swiss chalet architecture